The Twelfth Mother of all Battles Championship, commonly referred to as the 2002 Iraqi Elite Cup, was the twelfth occurrence of the Iraqi Elite Cup. The competition was organised by the Iraq Football Association and the top eight teams of the 2001–02 Iraqi Elite League competed in the tournament. The competition started on 9 August 2002 and ended on 20 August 2002, where in the final, held at Al-Shaab Stadium, Al-Shorta defeated Al-Talaba 1–0 to win the cup for the third time in a row.

Group stage

Group 1

Group 2

Semifinals

Third place match

Final

Awards

References

External links
 Iraqi Football Website

2002–03 in Iraqi football
Football competitions in Iraq